Vítor Baptista da Costa (13 May 1920 – 2008), is a former Portuguese footballer who played as a forward.

He is most known for his short three–year spell at Benfica, where he scored 40 goals in 70 games, winning the Taça de Portugal in 1948–49.

Career
Born in Macieira de Cambra, Vale de Cambra, Baptista started at  Vale de Cambra SC, followed by Associação Desportiva Valecambrense and finally Sanjoanense. He joined Benfica in 1946, making his debut on 6 October against Oriental. Despite heavy competition from Espírito Santo, Julinho and Rogério Pipi, he still finished the season with 33 appearances, scoring 24 goals in all competitions.

His second season was less prolific, as his playing time dropped, and he scored only 10 goals in 26 matches. In his third and final year at Benfica, he numbers dropped again to 11 games and six goals, but still help them win the Taça de Portugal, in his only silverware there. In total, in the three years at Benfica, Baptista played 70 games and scored 40 goals. Afterwards, he returned to Sanjoanense to play for few more seasons, taking on management in lower levels clubs of his home-town in 1952.

Honours
Benfica
Taça de Portugal: 1948–49

References
General
 

Specific

1920 births
2008 deaths
Portuguese footballers
Association football forwards
Primeira Liga players
S.L. Benfica footballers
Sportspeople from Aveiro District